The 2021 Gran Premio d'Italia  was the third event in the 2021–22 ISU Grand Prix of Figure Skating, a senior-level international invitational competition series. It was held at the Torino Palavela in Turin on November 5–7. It was the replacement event for Cup of China. Medals were awarded in the disciplines of men's singles, women's singles, pairs, and ice dance. Skaters earned points toward qualifying for the 2021–22 Grand Prix Final.

On August 27, 2021, the International Skating Union announced that the Gran Premio d'Italia would replace Cup of China, which was cancelled on August 16 due to travel restrictions and quarantine requirements related to the COVID-19 pandemic. In an attempt to preserve the Grand Prix series, the ISU asked for other ISU members to apply as hosts on the originally scheduled dates. In addition to the successful bid from the Federazione Italiana Sport del Ghiaccio (Turin), the ISU received applications from the Hungarian Skating Federation (Debrecen) and U.S. Figure Skating (Norwood, Massachusetts).

At the time of Cup of China's cancellation, the Figure Skating Federation of Russia expressed confidence in the ISU's ability to find a replacement, but declined to bid itself. The last time the event was cancelled, in 2018, Cup of China was replaced by the Grand Prix of Helsinki.

Entries 
The International Skating Union announced the preliminary assignments on June 29, 2021. The Gran Premio d'Italia assignments were updated on September 10; the Chinese Skating Association's not-yet-assigned host spots (one in pairs and one in ice dance) as of Cup of China's cancellation were reallocated to the Federazione Italiana Sport del Ghiaccio. Subsequent withdrawals by Chinese skaters were also replaced by Italian skaters.

Changes to preliminary assignments

Results

Men

Women

Pairs

Ice dance

References

External links 
 Gran Premio d'Italia at the International Skating Union
 Results

2021 in figure skating
2021 in Italian sport
November 2021 sports events in Italy
2021 Gran Premio d'Italia